Ivalu is a Greenlandic Inuit feminine given name meaning "tendon, thread, sinew." It was among the 10 most popular names given to girls born in Greenland during the past decade. Ivalo is a Danish variant. The variant name Ivalo was given to Princess Josephine of Denmark, born in 2011, as one of her middle names. 

Ivalu is also the name of a 1930 novel by Peter Freuchen.

People with the surname 

 Madeline Ivalu, Canadian Inuk filmmaker and actor
 Paul-Dylan Ivalu, Canadian Inuk actor

Notes

Danish feminine given names